Heartthrob is a 2017 American thriller film written and directed by Chris Sivertson. It stars both Keir Gilchrist as Henry and Aubrey Peeples as Samantha, over a chance meeting, both form a relationship. However, things  go downhill as Henry's obsession with Samantha takes a dark turn.

Plot
Shortly after high school graduation, Henry (Keir Gilchrist), the shy valedictorian, encounters Samantha (Aubrey Peeples), who suffers from a reputation as a bimbo at school.

They argue at first about their preconceptions of each other, but later Henry apologizes and offers Samantha a ride home when her shift at work ends. He is overjoyed to find romance with her, but is incensed by the knowledge of her past relations with others and kills one of her former lovers.

Henry is accepted to MIT, the university of choice of his domineering mother, but he drops out in order to stay in town with Samantha, who has been warned about his obsessive behavior and who breaks up with him to allow him to attend the better university.

Henry is convinced that she is being pressured into leaving him and targets those he believes are responsible. He kills her close friend Dustin and then proceeds to call Samantha and tell her that he had worked things out with MIT, and invites her to his house to celebrate.

While eating a homemade dinner there, she hears a thumping from an upstairs bedroom and discovers Henry's mother tied to a chair. Henry pulls out a knife and offers to either release his mother or kill her to solve their relationship problems, admitting that he was responsible for Dustin's death.

Samantha convinces him to release his mother, who escapes out his bedroom window and runs from the house screaming for help. Henry begs Samantha to run away with him but she refuses. Realizing that Samantha is different in the way that she doesn't need anyone, and also content with the fact that she loved him, he says one final "I love you" and stabs himself in the chest, dying on the spot.

Two days after his death Samantha receives Henry's journal in the mail. She decides to keep it a secret and thinks back to all the time that they spent together. Her shrink says that the relationship was unhealthy, and even though she accepts it, she knows that Henry truly loved her and saw her differently than everyone else.

The movie ends with Samantha sitting on the floor of the skating ring, where Henry brought her to on their first date. She then says "I love you, Henry,"  something which she deeply regrets not saying to him when he was alive.

Cast

 Aubrey Peeples as Sam Maddox
 Keir Gilchrist as Henry Sinclair
 Peter Facinelli as Mr. Rickett
 Jimmy Bennett as Dustin
 Taylor Dearden as Cleo
 Ione Skye as Jody
 Felicity Price as Colette
 Tristan Decker as Bailey
 Connor Muhl as Flynn
 Rebecca Huey as Tina
 Caroline Huey as Tasha
 Daniel Nsengimana as Josh
 Austin Kulman as Brendan
 Reza Leal-Smartt as Audrey Bellwether
 Ian Bond as Danny
 Echo Bull as Mrs. Tachuk
 Lowell Deo as Mr. Tachuk
 Aaron Ross as DJ
 Nazlah Black as Rhoda
 Skyler Verity as Guitar Dude
 Thom Delahunt as Diner Patron
 Giovanni V. Giusti as Firekeeper

Production
Filming took place in Tacoma, Washington.

Release
The film had a limited release in the United States on June 27, 2017.

References

External links

 

2017 thriller films
2017 films
American thriller films
Films directed by Chris Sivertson
Films scored by James Dooley
Films shot in Washington (state)
2010s English-language films
2010s American films